Vladimir Sergeyevich Solovyov (also romanized as Soloviev;  – ) was a Russian philosopher, theologian, poet, pamphleteer, and literary critic, who played a significant role in the development of Russian philosophy and poetry at the end of the 19th century and in the spiritual renaissance of the early 20th century.

Life and work
Vladimir Solovyov was born in Moscow; the son of the historian Sergey Mikhaylovich Solovyov (1820–1879); his elder brother Vsevolod (1849-1903), became a historical novelist, and his younger sister, Polyxena (1867-1924), became a poet.  Vladimir Solovyov's mother Polyxena Vladimirovna belonged to a family of Polish origin and had, among her ancestors, philosopher  Gregory Skovoroda (1722–1794).

In his teens, he renounced Eastern Orthodoxy for nihilism, but later his disapproval of positivism saw him begin to express views that were in line with those of the Orthodox Church. From 1869 to 1873 Solovyov studied at the Imperial Moscow University, where his philosophy professor was Pamfil Yurkevich (1826-1874).

In his 1874 work The Crisis of Western Philosophy: Against the Positivists (Solovyov discredited the positivists' rejection of Aristotle's essentialism, or philosophical realism. In Against the Positivists he took the position of intuitive noetic comprehension, or insight. He saw consciousness as integral (see the Russian term sobornost) and requiring both phenomenon (validated by dianoia) and noumenon validated intuitively. Positivism, according to Solovyov, validates only the phenomenon of an object, denying the intuitive reality that people experience as part of their consciousness. As Solovyov's basic philosophy rests on the idea that the essence of an object (see essentialism) can be validated only by intuition and that consciousness as a single organic whole is done in part by reason or logic but in completeness by (non-dualist) intuition. Solovyov was partially attempting to reconcile the dualism (subject-object) found in German idealism.
 
In 1877, Solovyov moved to Saint Petersburg, where he became a friend and confidant of the writer Fyodor Dostoyevsky (1821–1881). In opposition to his friend, Solovyov was sympathetic to the Roman Catholic Church. He favoured the healing of the schism (ecumenism, sobornost) between the Orthodox and Roman Catholic Churches. It is clear from Solovyov's work that he accepted papal primacy over the Universal Church, but there is not enough evidence, to support the claim that he ever officially embraced Roman Catholicism.
As an active member of Society for the Promotion of Culture Among the Jews of Russia, he spoke Hebrew and struggled to reconcile Judaism and Christianity. Politically, he became renowned as the leading defender of Jewish civil rights in tsarist Russia in the 1880s. Solovyov also advocated for his cause internationally and published a letter in The London Times pleading for international support for his struggle. The Jewish Encyclopedia describes him as "a friend of the Jews" and states that "Even on his death-bed he is said to have prayed for the Jewish people".

Solovyov's attempts to chart a course of civilization's progress toward an East-West Christian ecumenicism developed an increasing bias against Asian cultures - which he had initially studied with great interest. He dismissed the Buddhist concept of Nirvana as a pessimistic nihilistic "nothingness", antithetical to salvation and no better than Gnostic dualism. Solovyov spent his final years obsessed with fear of the "Yellow Peril", warning that soon the Asian peoples, especially the Chinese, would invade and destroy Russia.

Solovyov further elaborated this theme in his apocalyptic short-story "Tale of the Antichrist" (published in the Nedelya newspaper on 27 February 1900), in which China and Japan join forces to conquer Russia. His 1894 poem Pan-Mongolism, whose opening lines serve as epigraph to the story, was widely seen as predicting the coming Russo-Japanese War of 1904-1905.

Solovyov never married or had children, but he pursued idealized relationships as immortalized in his spiritual love-poetry, including with two women named Sophia. He rebuffed the advances of the Christian mystic , who claimed to be his divine partner. In his later years, Solovyov became a vegetarian, but ate fish occasionally. He often lived alone for months without a servant and would work into the night.

Influence
It is widely held that Solovyov was one of the sources for Dostoevsky's characters Alyosha Karamazov and Ivan Karamazov in The Brothers Karamazov. In Janko Lavrin's opinion, Solovyov has not left a single work which can be considered an epoch-making contribution to philosophy as such. And yet his writings have proved one of the most stimulating influences to the religious-philosophic thought of his country. Solovyov's influence can also be seen in the writings of the Symbolist and Neo-Idealist writers of the later Russian Soviet era. His book The  can be seen as one of the philosophical sources of Leo Tolstoy's The Kreutzer Sonata (1889). It was also the work in which he introduced the concept of 'syzygy', to denote 'close union'.

Sophiology

Solovyov compiled a philosophy based on Hellenistic philosophy (see Plato, Aristotle and Plotinus) and early Christian tradition with Buddhist and Hebrew Kabbalistic elements (Philo of Alexandria). He also studied Gnosticism and the works of the Gnostic Valentinus. His religious philosophy was syncretic and fused philosophical elements of various religious traditions with Orthodox Christianity and his own experience of Sophia.

Solovyov described his encounters with the entity Sophia in his works, such as Three Encounters and Lectures on Godmanhood. His fusion was driven by the desire to reconcile and/or unite with Orthodox Christianity the various traditions by the Russian Slavophiles' concept of sobornost. His Russian religious philosophy had a very strong impact on the Russian Symbolist art movements of his time. His teachings on Sophia, conceived as the merciful unifying feminine wisdom of God comparable to the Hebrew Shekinah or various goddess traditions, have been deemed a heresy by Russian Orthodox Church Outside Russia and as unsound and unorthodox by the Patriarchate of Moscow. This condemnation, however, was not agreed upon by other jurisdictions of the Orthodox church and was directed specifically against Sergius Bulgakov who continued to be defended by his own hierarch Metropolitan Evlogy until his death.

In his 2005 forward to Solovyov’s Justification of the Good, the Orthodox Christian theologian David Bentley Hart wrote a defense of Sophiology including a specific defense of Solovyov's later thought:

It is important to note that, in Solovyov’s developed reflections upon this figure (and in those of his successor Sophiologists,’ Pavel Florensky and Sergei Bulgakov), she was most definitely not an occult, or pagan, or Gnostic goddess, nor was she a fugitive from some Chaldean mystery cult, nor was she a speculative perversion of the Christian doctrine of God. She was not a fourth hypostasis in the Godhead, nor a fallen fragment of God, nor a literal world-soul, nor an eternal hypostasis who became incarnate as the Mother of God, nor most certainly the ‘feminine aspect of deity.’ Solovyov possessed too refined a mind to fall prey to the lure of cultic mythologies or childish anthropomorphisms, despite his interest in Gnosticism (or at least in its special pathos); and all such characterizations of the figure of Sophia are the result of misreadings (though, one must grant, misreadings partly occasioned by the young Solovyov’s penchant for poetic hyperbole). In truth, the divine Sophia is first and foremost a biblical figure, and ‘Sophiology’ was born of an honest attempt to interpret intelligibly the role ascribed to her in the Wisdom literature of the Old Testament, in such a way as to complement the Logos Christology of the Fourth Gospel, while still not neglecting the ‘autonomy’ of creation within its very dependency upon the Logos.

Sobornost

Solovyov sought to create a philosophy that could through his system of logic or reason reconcile all bodies of knowledge or disciplines of thought, and fuse all conflicting concepts into a single system. The central component of this complete philosophic reconciliation was the Russian Slavophile concept of sobornost (organic or spontaneous order through integration, which is related to the Russian word for 'catholic'). Solovyov sought to find and validate common ground, or where conflicts found common ground, and, by focusing on this common ground, to establish absolute unity and/or integral fusion of opposing ideas and/or peoples.

Death
Intense mental work shattered Solovyov's health. He died at the Moscow estate of Nikolai Petrovitch Troubetzkoy, where a relative of the latter, Sergei Nikolaevich Trubetskoy, was living.

By 1900, Solovyov was apparently a homeless pauper. He left his brother, Mikhail Sergeevich, and several colleagues to defend and promote his intellectual legacy. He is buried at Novodevichy Convent.

Quotes
"But if the faith communicated by the Church to Christian humanity is a living faith, and if the grace of the sacraments is an effectual grace, the resultant union of the divine and the human cannot be limited to the special domain of religion, but must extend to all Man's common relationships and must regenerate and transform his social and political life."

Works
English translations
 The Burning Bush: Writings on Jews and Judaism, Compiled 2016 by Lindisfarne Books,  
 The Crisis of Western Philosophy: Against the Positivists, 1874. Reprinted 1996 by Lindisfarne Books,  
 The Philosophical Principles of Integral Knowledge (1877)
 The Critique of Abstract Principles (1877–80)
 Lectures on Divine Humanity (1877–91)
 The Russian Idea, 1888. Translation published in 2015 by CreateSpace Independent Publishing Platform,  
 A Story of Anti-Christ (novel), 1900. Reprinted 2012 by Kassock Bros. Publishing Co.,  
 The Justification of the Good, 1918. Reprinted 2010 by Cosimo Classics,  
 The Meaning of Love. Reprinted 1985 by Lindisfarne Books,  
 War, Progress, and the End of History: Three Conversations, Including a Short Story of the Anti-Christ, 1915. Reprinted 1990 by Lindisfarne Books,  
 Russia and the Universal Church,. Reprinted 1948 by G. Bles.  (Abridged version: The Russian Church and the Papacy, 2002, Catholic Answers)
  103 pages

See also

 Apophatic theology
 Mikhail Epstein
 Leo Mikhailovich Lopatin
 Vladimir Lossky
 Phronesis

References

Footnotes

Works cited

 
 
 
 
 
 
 
 
 
 
 
  <https://core.ac.uk/download/pdf/62435007.pdf>

Further reading

 du Quenoy, Paul. "Vladimir Solov’ev in Egypt: The Origins of the ‘Divine Sophia’ in Russian Religious Philosophy," Revolutionary Russia, 23: 2, December 2010.
 Finlan, Stephen. "The Comedy of Divinization in Soloviev," Theosis: Deification in Christian Theology (Eugene, Or.: Wipf & Stock, 2006), pp. 168–183.
 Gerrard, Thomas J. "Vladimir Soloviev – The Russian Newman," The Catholic World, Vol. CV, April/September, 1917.
 Groberg, Kristi. "Vladimir Sergeevich Solov'ev: a Bibliography," Modern Greek Studies Yearbook, vol.14–15, 1998.
 Kornblatt, Judith Deutsch. "Vladimir Sergeevich Solov’ev," Dictionary of Literary Bibliography, v295 (2004), pp. 377–386.
 Mrówczyński-Van Allen, Artur. Between the Icon and the idol. The Human Person and the Modern State in Russian Literature and Thought - Chaadayev, Soloviev, Grossman (Cascade Books, /Theopolitical Visions/, Eugene, Or., 2013).
 Nemeth, Thomas. The Early Solov'ëv and His Quest for Metaphysics. Springer, 2014.  [Print];  [eBook]
 Stremooukhoff, Dimitrii N. Vladimir Soloviev and his Messianic Work (Paris, 1935; English translation: Belmont, MA: Nordland, 1980).
 Sutton, Jonathan. The Religious Philosophy of Vladimir Solovyov: Towards a Reassessment (Basingstoke, UK: Macmillan, 1988).
 Zernov, Nicholas. Three Russian prophets (London: SCM Press, 1944).

External links
 
 
 Vladimir Solovyov (1853–1900) – entry on Solovyov at Internet Encyclopedia of Philosophy
 http://www.orthodoxphotos.com/readings/end/antichrist.shtml
 ALEXANDER II AND HIS TIMES: A Narrative History of Russia in the Age of Alexander II, Tolstoy, and Dostoevsky Several chapters on Solovyov
 http://www.utm.edu/research/iep/s/solovyov.htm
 http://www.christendom-awake.org/pages/soloviev/soloviev.html
 http://www.christendom-awake.org/pages/soloviev/biffi.html (address by Cardinal Giacomo Biffi)
 Vladimir-Sergeyevich-Solovyov // Britannica
 http://www.valley.net/~transnat/solsoc.html
  – excerpt from Three Conversations by Solovyov
 Civil Society and National Religion: Problems of Church, State, and Society in the Philosophy of Vladimir Solov'ëv (1853–1900) – research project at Centre for Russian Humanities Studies, Radboud Universiteit Nijmegen
 http://rumkatkilise.org/necplus.htm
 English translations of 5 poems, including 8 of 18 acrostics from the cycle "Sappho"
 English translations of 2 poems by Babette Deutsch and Avrahm Yarmolinsky, 1921
 "The Positive Unity: How Solovyov's Ethics Can Contribute to Constructing a Working Model for Business Ethics in Modern Russia" by Andrey V. Shirin

1853 births
1900 deaths
19th-century Christian mystics
19th-century philosophers
19th-century theologians
Burials at Novodevichy Cemetery
Christian philosophers
Critics of atheism
Honorary members of the Saint Petersburg Academy of Sciences
Imperial Moscow University alumni
Pamphleteers
People from Moscow Governorate
Philosophers of literature
Philosophers of mind
Philosophers of love
Philosophers of religion
Platonists
Russian male poets
Russian Orthodox Christians from Russia
Russian people of Polish descent
Russian people of Ukrainian descent
Russian philosophers
Russian satirists
Sophiology
Writers from Moscow
Catholicism and Eastern Orthodoxy